HMS Somaliland (K594) was a  of the United Kingdom that served during World War II. She originally was ordered by the United States Navy as the Tacoma-class patrol frigate USS Popham (PF-90) and was transferred to the Royal Navy prior to completion.

Construction and acquisition
The ship, originally designated a "patrol gunboat," PG-198, was ordered by the United States Maritime Commission under a U.S. Navy contract as USS Popham. She was reclassified as a "patrol frigate," PF-90, on 15 April 1943 and laid down by the Walsh-Kaiser Company at Providence, Rhode Island, on 11 October 1943. Intended for transfer to the United Kingdom, the ship was renamed Somaliland by the British prior to launching and was launched on 11 November 1943.

Service history
Transferred to the United Kingdom under Lend-Lease on, according to different sources, either 22 February 1944 or 24 June 1944, the ship served in the Royal Navy as HMS Somaliland (K594) on patrol and escort duty.

Disposal
The United Kingdom returned Somaliland to the U.S. Navy on 22 May 1946. She was scrapped in 1947.

References

Notes

Bibliography
 Navsource Online: Frigate Photo Archive HMS Somaliland (K 594) ex-Popham ex-PF-90 ex-PG-198

External links
 Photo gallery of HMS Somaliland

1943 ships
Ships built in Providence, Rhode Island
Tacoma-class frigates
Colony-class frigates
World War II frigates and destroyer escorts of the United States
World War II frigates of the United Kingdom